Taoufik Rouabah (born 6 May 1970) is an Algerian football manager who most recently was in charge of Olympique de Médéa.

References

External links
Taoufik Rouabah at Footballdatabase

1970 births
Algerian football managers
Football in Algeria
Living people
Saudi Professional League managers
21st-century Algerian people